Gerry Gallagher (born December 15, 1951) is an American football coach and former player.  He is currently the offensive coordinator at Parsippany High School in Parsippany, New Jersey, a position he has held since 2013.  Gallagher served as the head coach at Saint Francis University in Loretto, Pennsylvania from 1986 to 1988 and at William Paterson University from 1989 to 1996, compiling a career college football record of 44–64–1.

A native of Morris County, New Jersey, Gallagher attended Morris Catholic High School, where he graduated in 1969. He then attended William Paterson University to play football for the school's first ever team. Gallagher would score the first two touchdowns in the program's history.

Gallagher began his coaching career at Morris Catholic High School, where he served as an assistant coach from 1973 to 1976. In 1977, he became the new head coach and held that position until 1983. Gallagher's first college football coaching job was spent at Edinboro University of Pennsylvania for the 1984 and 1985 seasons as an offensive coordinator, followed by three years at Saint Francis and eight at William Paterson. Since 1997 he has coached at Montville High School in New Jersey and in 2006 guided the Montville Mustangs to the State Championship Game at Giants Stadium. 

Through the 2009 college football season, Gallagher is the only William Paterson coach to guide his team to any playoff appearances. In 1991, William Paterson made it to the first round of the ECAC playoffs, and in 1993 they made it to the second round of the NCAA Division III playoffs.

In 2015, Coach Gallagher began coaching the defensive backs at the Delbarton School, in Morristown, New Jersey.  He was named Special Teams Coordinator at Delbarton in 2016.  

In addition, Gallagher was inducted into the New Jersey Football Coaches Association Hall of Fame in 2011 following him being Coach Of The Year in 2006.

Offensive philosophy
Gallagher has, throughout his coaching career, been a strong adherent to the Delaware Wing-T system. It relies heavily on misdirection and motion to confuse the opposing defense while their linebackers are trying to make reads. Gallagher has experienced varying levels of success with this system throughout his career as the system demands a lot from the offensive linemen. Their abilities to hold blocks, pull with speed and to remember their assignments which are often given in pairs or threes for each play. Gallagher saw the most success with this system most recently in the 2006 football system, where his Montville team matched up against West Essex High School in then-Giants Stadium for the Group 3 State Championship, where he does coached athletes such as John Gauweiler, Mike Todisco, and Chris Collins.

Head coaching record

College

References

1951 births
Living people
Edinboro Fighting Scots football coaches
Saint Francis Red Flash football coaches
William Paterson Pioneers football coaches
William Paterson Pioneers football players
High school football coaches in New Jersey
People from Montville, New Jersey
Players of American football from New Jersey